Ida Maline Smoot Dusenberry (May 5, 1873 – April 25, 1955) was a Utah educator and a leader in the Relief Society of the Church of Jesus Christ of Latter-day Saints (LDS Church).

Biography
Ida Smoot was born in Salt Lake City, Utah Territory, to Abraham O. Smoot and Anne Kirstine Mauritsen on May 5, 1873. She was the sister of Reed Smoot and Brigham Smoot.

Dusenberry attended Brigham Young Academy in Provo beginning at age five, graduating in 1897. While in school she married George A. Dusenberry (1891) and became the mother of two children. She lost her mother, father, and husband during the next three years. Dusenberry was trained as a kindergarten teacher at Chauncy Hall School in Boston from 1898 to 1899. Upon her return to Provo, she became the principal of the Kindergarten Normal Training school and organized a class for parents. Dusenberry was appointed as vice president of Salt Lake's Women's Congress in 1900 and then served multiple terms as the president of the Utah State Kindergarten Association beginning the following year.  In 1910 she spent three years in graduate school at Columbia University and during that time continued to speak at many national conferences. She also received a bachelor of pedagogy degree from Brigham Young University (BYU) in 1906. In 1921, Dusenberry became an assistant professor of psychology at BYU. She worked as a faculty member at BYU until retiring in 1943. 

In 1901, Dusenberry became a member of the general presidency of the Relief Society; she was the second counselor to Bathsheba W. Smith. Dusenberry served in this capacity until Smith's death in 1910, when the presidency was dissolved. Dusenberry remained a member of the Relief Society general board until 1921. As a member of the general presidency and general board of the Relief Society, Dusenberry represented the Relief Society to the National Council of Women of the United States, the International Council of Women, the National Convention of Charities and Corrections, and the Suffrage Convention.

She died in Provo, Utah and was then buried there as well.

Publications

References

Andrew Jenson. Latter-day Saints Biographical Encyclopedia 2:169, 4:183–84.

External links
Materials relating to Ida Smoot Dusenberry in the L. Tom Perry Special Collections, Harold B. Lee Library, Brigham Young University

1873 births
1955 deaths
American leaders of the Church of Jesus Christ of Latter-day Saints
Mormon feminists
Counselors in the General Presidency of the Relief Society
Brigham Young Academy alumni
Columbia University alumni
Brigham Young University faculty
Smoot–Rowlett family
Schoolteachers from Utah
American women educators
American suffragists
People from Provo, Utah
Latter Day Saints from Utah